Transmembrane protein 200A is a protein that in humans is encoded by the TMEM200A gene.

References

Further reading 

 
 

Genes
Human proteins